Issaga Diallo (born 26 January 1987) is a French–Senegalese footballer who plays as a midfielder.

Career
Diallo signed for League Two club Cambridge United on 5 August 2014 on a free transfer.

References

External links

Issaga Diallo profile at football.ch
Issaga Diallo at Footballdatabase

1987 births
Living people
French sportspeople of Senegalese descent
French footballers
Senegalese footballers
Association football defenders
FC Saint-Louis Neuweg players
FC Locarno players
Servette FC players
Kaposvári Rákóczi FC players
Swiss Super League players
Nemzeti Bajnokság I players
Cambridge United F.C. players
English Football League players
FC Montceau Bourgogne players
Anagennisi Deryneia FC players
ASIL Lysi players
Cypriot First Division players
Cypriot Second Division players
Liga II players
ACS Foresta Suceava players
French expatriate footballers
Expatriate footballers in Switzerland
Expatriate footballers in Hungary
Expatriate footballers in England
Expatriate footballers in Romania
Expatriate footballers in Cyprus
French expatriate sportspeople in Switzerland
French expatriate sportspeople in Hungary
French expatriate sportspeople in Romania
French expatriate sportspeople in England
French expatriate sportspeople in Cyprus